Roc-A-Fella Records was an American hip hop record label and music management company founded by record executives and entrepreneurs Shawn "Jay-Z" Carter, Damon "Dame" Dash, and Kareem "Biggs" Burke in 1994.

History

1994–2000: Formation and early years 
Roc-A-Fella Records was founded in 1994, after Jay-Z had been rejected by major record labels, beginning as an independent outlet for rapper Jay-Z's first album. After being turned down by several major labels, Carter, Dash and Burke started their own label through Priority Records, using money from the music videos provided by Payday Records due to their singles only deal. Though Reasonable Doubt didn't immediately earn commercial success, it spawned several hits, and earned Jay-Z a reputation in hip hop. Starting out as Roc-A-Fella's only artist, Jay-Z was supported by The Notorious B.I.G.'s producer DJ Clark Kent and Camp Lo's producer DJ Ski; affiliated rappers, Sauce Money, Jaz-O, and a young Memphis Bleek, though only Memphis Bleek would eventually sign with the label.

The snub, and a sample clearance issue with the Nas-sampling Reasonable Doubt song "Dead Presidents II," were elements that contributed to tension between Jay-Z and Nas. In June 1997, Roc-A-Fella agreed to a 50/50 partnership and distribution deal with Def Jam Recordings. In November 1997, Def Jam released Jay-Z's second album, In My Lifetime, Vol. 1, as well as R&B duo Christión's only album for the label, Ghetto Cyrano, on the same day. Roc-A-Fella and Jay-Z saw increasing popularity, mainly due to a high-profile appearance by Jay on The Notorious B.I.G.'s posthumous Life After Death, complete with Roc-A-Fella and Damon Dash references. While Memphis Bleek signed with Roc-A-Fella, Sauce Money chose to pursue a deal with Priority, and Jaz refrained from signing anywhere and provided production for only one song on In My Lifetime, Vol. 1, "Rap Game/Crack Game." In 1998, Roc-A-Fella Records released the movie Streets Is Watching and the accompanying soundtrack; the film compiles various Jay-Z videos into a continuous story, and the album introduced more affiliated, future Roc-A-Fella Records acts Noreaga, M.O.P., and DJ Clue, as well as producer Irv Gotti and the short-lived group, Murder Inc. (namesake of Irv's record label, Murder Inc.).

Jay's 1998 album, Vol. 2... Hard Knock Life, saw him largely depart from his previous entourage and venture forth with producers Swizz Beatz, Timbaland, The 45 King and Jermaine Dupri. Vol. 2 spawned his first major hit, "Hard Knock Life", and became the label's first Platinum-RIAA certified release; it was the last Roc-A-Fella release to see appearances by Jaz-O or Sauce Money, and the first to feature new Roc artists Beanie Sigel and Amil. DJ Clue released the 1st of his collaboration-album-style series in The Professional, which saw the first Roc-A-Fella appearance of Cam'ron; meanwhile, DJ Ski had, at the time, formed the production company Roc-A-Blok, although the company folded when Ski moved out of New York to take a break from music.

Though Da Ranjahz put in appearances on Memphis Bleek's 1st album, Coming of Age, in 1999, they soon parted ways with Roc-A-Fella. Jay-Z's 1999 album Vol. 3... Life and Times of S. Carter continued Jay's new affiliations with then-popular producers; in 2000, the label saw a redefinition in both sound and roster. Jay-Z put out The Dynasty: Roc La Familia as a solo album. Originally intended to be a collaboration project, it nonetheless featured heavy appearances by Beanie Sigel, Amil, and Memphis Bleek, along with a Philly rapper Freeway guest spot that led to him being signed to Roc-A-Fella. Rather than return to Timbaland or Swizz Beatz for production, Jay selected beats from a new crop of producers: Kanye West, Bink, The Neptunes and Just Blaze. Each beat-smith would go on to become consistently involved in future Roc-A-Fella projects.

2000–2005: Prominence and split 
The new millennium saw Roc-A-Fella begin to expand beyond one figurehead artist. Although Jay-Z remained the label's prominent image—with the acclaimed release of The Blueprint and the closing of his trial for the 1999 stabbing of producer Lance Rivera—other Roc artists began to gain popularity and acceptance. In 2000, Beanie Sigel released The Truth and reached #5 on the Billboard charts, DJ Clue released The Professional 2, and Memphis Bleek released The Understanding. Although Clue and Beans's albums hit the top five on the Billboard charts, Bleek's album was in the top twenty. Nonetheless, all three albums were certified Gold by the RIAA. Amil's album, however, had lackluster sales. Jay-Z and Damon Dash began signing up new talent, including Cam'ron, Freeway, and several young Philadelphia rappers that were later compiled into the Freeway/Sigel-led group, State Property. During this time, Jay-Z and Beanie Sigel were embroiled in a feud with Ruff Ryders artists Jadakiss and DMX. Disses back and forth between Jay-Z and Jadakiss implied a conflict between Jay and former groupmate DMX, led to a full-on war of words between Sigel and Kiss, and eventually culminated in a diss by Beanie Sigel over Jada's hit "Put Your Hands Up," after which the rivalry faded.

Cam'ron put out his Roc-A-Fella debut Come Home with Me in 2002 to Platinum-RIAA certified status, and shortly after signed his group The Diplomats to Roc-A-Fella, as well. From 2002 to 2003, Damon Dash signed several artists in response to Jay-Z's talk of retirement after his 2002 album The Blueprint2: The Gift & The Curse. He signed M.O.P. and Ol' Dirty Bastard, gave Grafh a joint-venture deal, and attempted to sign Twista and Joe Budden. Twista never signed to Roc-A-Fella due to his deal with Atlantic Records. Roc-A-Fella experienced its height in product releases and overall popularity as a brand name during this period, seeing the release of State Property's Chain Gang albums, Juelz Santana's From Me to U, Freeway's debut Philadelphia Freeway, The Diplomats' group debut album Diplomatic Immunity, Memphis Bleek's M.A.D.E. and Jay-Z's alleged final album, The Black Album. Rumors of friction between Carter and Dash became apparent; though denied by both camps at the time, problems involving Damon's media attention and Jay's alleged inaccessibility had been brewing since the music video shoot for "Big Pimpin'".

After Jay-Z's supposed last hurrah, it was revealed that he had accepted a position as CEO and President of Def Jam Recordings, and The Island Def Jam Music Group purchased the remaining 50 percent stake of Roc-A-Fella Records that IDJ didn't already own. Dash, poised to take greater control in the company, began heavily promoting artists Cam'ron, The Diplomats, State Property, Kanye West, and Twista. In 2004, Kanye West's album, The College Dropout, became a huge commercial and critical success, selling multi-Platinum-RIAA certified sales, and Foxy Brown was signed and began work on her album, Black Rose. The infamous 'split' between Dash, Carter, and Burke occurred when it was revealed the trio had sold their 50% interest in Roc-A-Fella to The Island Def Jam Music Group, making the label full owners. As President, Carter retained control of the Roc and his masters, ousting his 2 former partners. He later explained that he had offered to turn down the position and ownership for the masters to Reasonable Doubt alone:

As Dash and Burke set up their own fledgling record label, originally called Roc4life and later rechristened to Dame Dash Music Group, each artist was offered their choice of labels. Memphis Bleek and Kanye West remained on Roc-A-Fella. The Diplomats opted to leave Roc-A-Fella in 2004 and remained on their Diplomat Records label and signed to Koch Records for distribution. Cam'Ron chose not to stay with either Dame Dash Music Group or Roc-A-Fella and instead stayed with Diplomat Records and signed with Asylum Records for distribution for his next few albums. Cam'ron was especially vocal in running a smear campaign against Jay-Z, claiming Jay-Z blocked him from an executive position Dash had offered him at Roc-A-Fella.

Beanie Sigel, then doing a year's incarceration on an attempted murder charge, put out his album The B.Coming on Dame Dash and Roc-A-Fella; this was accompanied by accusations from Dash that of all the members of State Property, only Oschino had gone to visit Sigel in prison. Though Beanie had initially chosen Dame Dash Music Group, the rest of the group refused, preferring to remain on Roc-A-Fella; in response, Beanie Sigel effectively put the group on hold, claiming disappointment in his groupmates. M.O.P. and Grafh also left Roc-A-Fella for Dame Dash Music Group, though both acts parted ways with Dash soon thereafter. Due to the 2004 death of Ol' Dirty Bastard, Dash also brought with him masters of the rapper's project and promises to release the album, A Son Unique, though this never occurred.

Memphis Bleek and Kanye West released 534 and Late Registration, respectively, in 2005, along with the Young Gunz' sophomore effort and Teairra Mari's debut, though only Kanye West's project saw significant sales. It was stated by Memphis Bleek that Cory Gunz had signed, but nothing materialized. By the end of the year, Dash had split his label from Def Jam and Jay-Z's role overseeing his project, after asking for more money and a bigger role in the company. Dame Dash Music Group left Def Jam and was subsequently dissolved.

2006–2009: Roc Redefinition and departure of Jay-Z 
In 2006, releases were largely limited to those of Roc-La-Familia, a Latino-geared label under Roc-A-Fella that followed the trend of reggaeton. Héctor el Father and N.O.R.E. both put out albums, and the label was home to New York rapper Tru Life, but has since folded. Jay-Z made his return that year with Kingdom Come, to mixed reviews. He stepped down from his Def Jam position and put out a second album in 2007, American Gangster, to more positive reviews and sales, along with Kanye West's Graduation, Beanie Sigel's The Solution, and Freeway's Free at Last; Kanye West's album sold multi-platinum to rave reviews. Freeway's project received acclaim but not major sales, and contained comments aimed at Kanye West and Just Blaze for not supplying production. He later amended his comments, stating he desired to work with Just Blaze but the producer hasn't reached out. This may have been due to Just Blaze's work on American Gangster and complications regarding his Atlantic-distributed label, Fort Knocks, and his artist Saigon.

The signing of Ruff Ryders artist Jadakiss, former rival to both Jay-Z and Beanie Sigel, also came in 2007, as did Uncle Murda. Foxy Brown was dropped from the label after 2 years, in light of a jail sentence. Though Young Chris and Peedi Crakk continued to appear on projects, neither seemed any closer to solo projects, and in 2008 Peedi Crakk announced that State Property had been dropped from the label. This was countered by Beanie Sigel's manager, who confirmed that Beanie Sigel and Freeway were still part of Roc-A-Fella. Young Chris also apparently signed as a solo artist. 2008 saw only the release of Kanye West's 808's & Heartbreak, garnering decent sales. It also brought repeated disses in songs and interviews from Peedi Crakk towards Jay-Z, claiming he held up his project on purpose, though he claims to have moved on. During that year, Jay-Z had inked a $150 million deal with Live Nation that included concerts, endorsements and recordings, and included a platform for him to launch his Roc Nation label. Uncle Murda left the label after a year and a half with no release, citing lack of executive interest after Jay-Z left Def Jam.

In March 2009, Freeway procured his release from Def Jam, claiming a need to explore his options; shortly, he announced his signing to Ca$h Money, while stating he would always respect Roc-A-Fella. Longtime signee Memphis Bleek also reported his departure from Def Jam, deciding not to travel to Roc Nation in favor of starting his own record label, but he is still very close with Roc-A-Fella. Additionally, Tru Life has been referred to as a "1 time [or past] affiliate" of Roc-A-Fella upon his turning himself in to authorities for his connection to a retaliatory stabbing. On May 21, 2009, Jay-Z had bought back his contract from Def Jam for an unprecedented $5,000,000 and started his deal with Live Nation.

2010–2013: Final years and TufAmerica vs. Roc-A-Fella 
Jadakiss briefly moved to Roc-A-Fella and released an album The Last Kiss before reuniting with Ruff Ryders. On May 3, 2010, Damon Dash relaunched Roc-A-Fella after nearly a year of inactivity with his 1st artist being former Young Money rapper Curren$y. Curren$y's third album, Pilot Talk, was to be released under the newly relaunched Roc-A-Fella however, Curren$y stated in interviews with both XXL and Complex that the album would be released under Damon Dash's DD172 record label division, BluRoc Records and distributed through Def Jam. On August 8, 2011, Jay-Z and Kanye West, released a collaborative album titled Watch the Throne, it was later revealed that Jay-Z was part of a short relaunched Roc-A-Fella, as the album was released on Roc-A-Fella, Roc Nation and Def Jam.

In September 2012 Tuff City, a record company; filed a lawsuit on the grounds of copyright infringement by Roc-A-Fella, seeking undisclosed damages.  The complaint filed in federal court in Manhattan claims Roc-A-Fella and their parent Island Def Jam paid them a $62,500 license fee to sample Eddie Bo's "Hook and Sling, Part 1" in Kanye West's "Who Will Survive in America?" and "Lost in the World". Despite this, Tuff City says UMG and Roc-A-Fella "failed and refused to enter into written license agreements that accounted for their multiple other uses of ['Hook and Sling']".  The unmentioned uses TufAmerica refers to are the "Lost in the World" video and the short film based on Kanye's "Runaway". Tuff City is represented by New York attorney Kelly Talcott. On June 16, 2013, Jay-Z announced with a tweet : "VII IV XIII Roc A Fella/Roc Nation", hinting a possible relaunch and revival of Roc-A-Fella and a possible merger with Roc Nation. However, it meant that Roc-A-Fella was only relaunched for the purpose of releasing his new album, Magna Carta Holy Grail.

Legal issues 
In June 2021, Roc-A-Fella sued its co-founder Damon Dash for attempting to auction off a non-fungible token representing the Jay-Z album Reasonable Doubt, due to Roc-A-Fella owning the rights to the album. In response, Dash claimed that he was not trying to sell the album, but his own share of the record label. On June 22, a restraining order prohibiting Dash from further selling the album was placed.

Subsidiaries

ROC Films 
In 2002, Roc-A-Fella released through Lions Gate Entertainment, State Property. The movie, while not the first for Dash, would be the start of ROC Films/Roc-A-Fella Films. The film studio would go on to release Paid in Full the same year and follow up in 2003 with Paper Soldiers and the hip-hop satire Death of a Dynasty. In 2005, the sequel to the studios debut release would hit theatres State Property 2, featuring rap stars such as Beanie Sigel and Damon Dash, who also produced and co-created the story. Cameo roles included musicians Kanye West, N.O.R.E, and Mariah Carey, and light heavyweight champion boxers Bernard Hopkins and Winky Wright. The list of films include:

Streets Is Watching (1998)
Backstage (2000)
State Property (2002)
Paid in Full (2002)
Paper Soldiers (2002)
Death of a Dynasty (2003)
Fade to Black (2004)
State Property 2 (2005)

Roc La Familia 
Roc-La-Familia was founded in 2005 by (then) Roc-A-Fella & Def Jam President/CEO Shawn Carter. This sub-label was created to focus on signing international recording artists.

Discography

Studio albums

Compilation albums

Live albums

See also 

 List of Roc-A-Fella Records artists

References

External links 

1996 establishments in New York City
Companies based in New York City
Defunct record labels of the United States
Film production companies of the United States
Film distributors of the United States
Hardcore hip hop record labels
Jay-Z
Labels distributed by Universal Music Group
Music production companies
Record labels established in 1996
Record labels disestablished in 2012
Contemporary R&B record labels
American hip hop record labels